Gornoye Tatarintsevo is a rural locality (a village) in Denisovskoye Rural Settlement, Gorokhovetsky District, Vladimir Oblast, Russia. The population was 4 as of 2010.

Geography 
Gornoye Tatarintsevo is located 21 km west of Gorokhovets (the district's administrative centre) by road. Petrunino is the nearest rural locality.

References 

Rural localities in Gorokhovetsky District